Spectrum pooling is a spectrum management strategy in which multiple radio spectrum users can coexist within a single allocation of radio spectrum space. One use of this technique is for primary users of a spectrum allocation to be able to rent out use of unused parts of their allocation to secondary users. Spectrum pooling schemes generally require cognitive radio techniques to implement them.

References 

Radio spectrum